Ciliatovelutina is a genus of small sea snails, marine gastropod mollusks in the family Velutinidae.

Species
Species within the genus Ciliatovelutina include:
 Ciliatovelutina capillata (Derjugin, 1950)
 Ciliatovelutina lanata (Derjugin, 1950)
 Ciliatovelutina lanigera (Møller, 1842) 
 Ciliatovelutina nana (Derjugin, 1950)

References

Velutinidae